The lieutenant governor of Quebec (French (masculine): Lieutenant-gouverneur du Québec, or (feminine): Lieutenante-gouverneure du Québec) is the viceregal representative in Quebec of the , who operates distinctly within the province but is also shared equally with the ten other jurisdictions of Canada, as well as the other Commonwealth realms and any subdivisions thereof, and resides predominantly in  oldest realm, the United Kingdom. The lieutenant governor of Quebec is appointed in the same manner as the other provincial viceroys in Canada and is similarly tasked with carrying out most of the monarch's constitutional and ceremonial duties. The present and 29th lieutenant governor of Quebec is J. Michel Doyon, who has served in the role since September 24, 2015.

Role and presence

The lieutenant governor of Quebec is tasked with a number of governmental duties. Not among them, though, is delivering the Throne Speech, which sets the lieutenant governor of Quebec apart from the other Canadian viceroys. (Instead, new parliaments begin with the Opening Speech by the premier.) The lieutenant governor is also expected to undertake various ceremonial roles. For instance, upon installation, the lieutenant governor automatically becomes a Knight or Dame of Justice and the Vice-Prior in Quebec of the Most Venerable Order of the Hospital of Saint John of Jerusalem. The lieutenant governor will present numerous other provincial honours and decorations and various awards that are named for and presented by the lieutenant governor, which were reinstated in 2000 by Lieutenant Governor Lise Thibault. These honours are presented at official ceremonies, which count among hundreds of other engagements the lieutenant governor takes part in each year, either as host or guest of honour; in 2006, the lieutenant governor of Quebec undertook 400 engagements and 200 in 2007.

At these events, the lieutenant governor's presence is marked by the lieutenant governor's standard, consisting of a blue field bearing the escutcheon of the Arms of  Majesty in Right of Quebec surmounted by a crown and set within a white disc; the Quebec viceregal flag is only one of two that are significantly different from all the others in Canada. Within Quebec, the lieutenant governor also follows only the sovereign in the province's order of precedence, preceding even other members of the Canadian Royal Family and the 's federal representative.

It has been argued by Jeremy Webber and Robert Andrew Young that, as the office is the core of authority in the province, the secession of Quebec from the Confederation would first require the abolition or transformation of the post of lieutenant governor of Quebec; such an amendment to the constitution of Canada could not be done without, according to Section 41 of the Constitution Act, 1982, the approval of the federal parliament and all other provincial legislatures in Canada. Others, such as J. Woehrling, however, have claimed that the legislative process towards Quebec's independence would not require any prior change to the viceregal post. Young also felt that the lieutenant governor could refuse Royal Assent to a bill that proposed to put an unclear question on sovereignty to referendum or was based on the results of a referendum that asked such a question.

History

The lieutenant governor of Quebec came into being in 1867, upon the creation of Quebec at Confederation, and evolved from the earlier position of lieutenant governor of Canada East. Since that date, 28 lieutenant governors have served the province, amongst whom were notable firsts, such as Lise Thibault—the first female and first disabled lieutenant governor of the province. The shortest mandate by a lieutenant governor of Quebec was Lomer Gouin, from January to March 1929, while the longest was Hugues Lapointe, from 1966 to 1978.

One of the few examples in Canada of a viceroy exercising the royal prerogative against or without ministerial advice came in 1887, when Lieutenant Governor Auguste-Réal Angers dismissed the Cabinet headed by Premier Honoré Mercier; a report concluded that Mercier's government had benefited from a kickback scheme with contractors building the Baie des Chaleurs railway.

The appointment of Jean-Louis Roux as lieutenant governor of Quebec by Governor General Roméo LeBlanc, on the advice of Prime Minister Jean Chrétien, stirred controversy, as Roux was well known as a strong opponent of Quebec independence and, soon after he took up the post, it was revealed that, as a university student in the 1940s, he had worn a swastika on his lab coat in protest of the proposal to invoke conscription for service in World War II and had participated in an anti-Semitic protest. Roux had, in an interview after his appointment as lieutenant governor, stated that he might have to use the reserve powers of the Crown should certain circumstances arise following a referendum result in favour of Quebec's separation from Canada; a statement that displeased Roux's premier at the time, Lucien Bouchard. Bouchard thereafter exploited the revelation of Roux's past anti-Semitism and the lieutenant governor soon resigned his post voluntarily in 1996. The following year, Bouchard tabled in the legislature three motions, calling the Office of the lieutenant governor "a heritage of the colonial past", the appointment process controversial and interfering, and demanding the post be abolished, though, until then, the federal Crown-in-Council should appoint a person "democratically designated by the [Quebec] Assembly".

Residences and Offices

Since 1997 there has been no official residence; the lieutenant governors must instead obtain their own home in or near the capital. However, they still retain an official office at Édifice André-Laurendeau.

Previous residences includes Maison Sewell at 87, rue Saint-Louis (still standing), Spencer Wood from 1870 to 1966 (destroyed by fire 1966) and 1010 rue St. Louis (Maison Dunn) from 1967 to 1997.

See also
 Monarchy in the Canadian provinces
 Government of Quebec
 Lieutenant Governors of Canada
 List of seignories of Quebec

References

External links

 
 Les lieutenants-gouverneurs depuis 1867 

Quebec
Westminster system